Valencia Canton is a canton of Ecuador, located in the Los Ríos Province.  Its capital is the town of Valencia.  Its population at the 2001 census was 32,870.

Demographics
Ethnic groups as of the Ecuadorian census of 2010:
Mestizo  59.3%
Montubio  28.2%
Afro-Ecuadorian  6.9%
White  4.8%
Indigenous  0.6%
Other  0.2%

References

Cantons of Los Ríos Province